José Emilio Amavisca Gárate (born 19 June 1971) is a Spanish retired footballer who played as a left midfielder or left winger.

He was best known for his Real Madrid stint but played for five other clubs, amassing 381 matches and 57 goals in both major levels of Spanish football during 16 seasons (307 games and 34 goals in La Liga alone).

A Spanish international in the 1990s, Amavisca represented the country at Euro 1996.

Club career
Born in Laredo, Cantabria, Amavisca (whose father Emilio was also a footballer) made his professional breakthrough with Real Valladolid, achieving promotion from Segunda División in 1992–93, also serving a spell on loan to UE Lleida in the same level. In the summer of 1994 he signed for La Liga giants Real Madrid, initially being deemed surplus to requirements but going on to score ten league goals in his debut season, mostly playing second striker to Iván Zamorano – both were initially seen as third or fourth-string attacking references by manager Jorge Valdano, as the club ended a four-year domestic title drought.

Amavisca's importance with the Merengues would gradually lessen in the subsequent years, however. In January 1999 he joined fellow league club Racing de Santander, thus returning to his native region and instantly became an essential member of the side, although his seven league goals in the 2000–01 campaign were not enough to avoid relegation.

Subsequently, Amavisca moved to Deportivo de La Coruña for 300 million pesetas, appearing in 28 games and netting three times for the 2002 runners-up but being sparingly used in the following two years, barred by veteran Fran and new signing Albert Luque. He retired after one season with RCD Espanyol, aged 34.

International career
After making his Spain debut on 7 September 1994, in an UEFA Euro 1996 qualifier against Cyprus (90 minutes, 2–1 away win), Amavisca appeared in the tournament's final stages, playing four matches in an eventual quarter-final exit. Due to having fallen out of favour at Real Madrid, he was overlooked for the squad at the 1998 FIFA World Cup.

Previously, Amavisca won the gold medal at the 1992 Summer Olympics in Barcelona.

International goals

Honours

Club
Real Madrid
La Liga: 1994–95, 1996–97
Supercopa de España: 1997
UEFA Champions League: 1997–98
Intercontinental Cup: 1998

Deportivo
Copa del Rey: 2001–02

Laredo
Tercera División: 1988–89

International
Spain U23
Summer Olympic Games: 1992

Individual
Spanish Player of the Year: 1995

References

External links

 
 
 
 

1971 births
Living people
People from Laredo, Cantabria
Spanish footballers
Footballers from Cantabria
Association football wingers
Association football forwards
La Liga players
Segunda División players
Tercera División players
Real Valladolid players
UE Lleida players
Real Madrid CF players
Racing de Santander players
Deportivo de La Coruña players
RCD Espanyol footballers
UEFA Champions League winning players
Spain youth international footballers
Spain under-21 international footballers
Spain under-23 international footballers
Spain international footballers
UEFA Euro 1996 players
Olympic footballers of Spain
Footballers at the 1992 Summer Olympics
Olympic medalists in football
Olympic gold medalists for Spain
Medalists at the 1992 Summer Olympics